In enzymology, a diiodophenylpyruvate reductase is an enzyme that catalyzes the chemical reaction

3-(3,5-diiodo-4-hydroxyphenyl)lactate + NAD+  3-(3,5-diiodo-4-hydroxyphenyl)pyruvate + NADH + H+

Thus, the two substrates of this enzyme are 3-(3,5-diiodo-4-hydroxyphenyl)lactate and NAD+, whereas its 3 products are 3-(3,5-diiodo-4-hydroxyphenyl)pyruvate, NADH, and H+.

This enzyme belongs to the family of oxidoreductases, specifically those acting on the CH-OH group of donor with NAD+ or NADP+ as acceptor.  The systematic name of this enzyme class is 3-(3,5-diiodo-4-hydroxyphenyl)lactate:NAD+ oxidoreductase. Other names in common use include aromatic alpha-keto acid, KAR, and 2-oxo acid reductase.

References

 

EC 1.1.1
NADH-dependent enzymes
Enzymes of unknown structure